Peter Willmott is an American businessman.

Early life and education 
Willmott graduated from Williams College in 1959 with a degree in economics. At Williams, he was, amongst various activities, captain of the basketball team. He went on to attend Harvard's Business School and graduated with a Masters of Business Administration in 1961.

Career 
After graduation, Willmott began working as a financial analyst for American Airlines, and then worked as a consultant for Booz, Allen & Hamilton. After that,  he was an executive of Federal Express Corporation in different positions from 1974 to 1983,  and  then served as Chief Executive Officer and President of Carson Pirie Scott & Co. until 1989. Since 1989,   has been the Chief Executive Officer of Willmott Services, Inc. He was   Chief Executive Officer and President of Zenith Electronics Corporation from 1996 to 1998. He is currently a Managing Partner at Berkshires Capital Investors.

While at Carson Pirie Scott & Co, the Chicago Tribune featured "A 12-hour Day In The Life Of Carsons' Willmott." Willmott appeared in newspapers again when in 2005, his former secretary  was found guilty of stealing over $9.5 million from him over years of working for him.

Personal life 
Willmott, an avid horse breeder, lives with his wife in Chicago, Illinois; they also have a house in Williamstown, Massachusetts.

Willmott served on Williams' Board of Trustees from 1983 to 1998 and was Chair of the Board from 1988 to 1998. He previously served on the board of trustees of the Clark Art Institute, the Associated Colleges of Illinois, and the Children's Memorial Medical Center.

References

Harvard Business School alumni
Williams College alumni
American retail chief executives
Living people
Year of birth missing (living people)
Place of birth missing (living people)